The 2018 Danish Handball Cup, known as Santander Cup 2018 for sponsorship reasons, is the 55th edition of the national women's handball cup tournament. Team Esbjerg are the defending champions.

Format
The initial 6 rounds are managed by the regional federations with the DHF taking over the tournament at the round of 16. It ultimately results in a final four event between Christmas and New Year. The winner of the tournament qualify for the Super Cup where they meet the season's league winner. If the same team wins both the league and the cup, the losing cup finalist will be participating in the Super Cup.

Round of 32
The round of 32 ties were scheduled through March to May 2018.

|-
!colspan="3" style="background:#ccccff;"| 27 March

|-
!colspan="3" style="background:#ccccff;"| 10 April

|-
!colspan="3" style="background:#ccccff;"| 11 April

|-
!colspan="3" style="background:#ccccff;"| 12 April

|-
!colspan="3" style="background:#ccccff;"| 17 April

|-
!colspan="3" style="background:#ccccff;"| 25 April

|-
!colspan="3" style="background:#ccccff;"| 1 May

|-
!colspan="3" style="background:#ccccff;"| 2 May

|-
!colspan="3" style="background:#ccccff;"| 3 May

|-
!colspan="3" style="background:#ccccff;"| 5 May

|-
!colspan="3" style="background:#ccccff;"| 14 May

|-
!colspan="3" style="background:#ccccff;"| 15 May

|-
!colspan="3" style="background:#ccccff;"| 17 May

|}

Round of 16
The round of 16 ties were scheduled for 14-23 August 2018.

|-
!colspan="3" style="background:#ccccff;"| 14 August

|-
!colspan="3" style="background:#ccccff;"| 22 August

|-
!colspan="3" style="background:#ccccff;"| 23 August

|-
!colspan="3" style="background:#ccccff;"| 24 August

|}

Quarter-finals
The quarter-final ties were scheduled for 17-20 September 2018.

|-
!colspan="3" style="background:#ccccff;"| 17 September

|-
!colspan="3" style="background:#ccccff;"| 18 September

|-
!colspan="3" style="background:#ccccff;"| 20 September

|}

Final4
The final four event is scheduled for 29-30 December 2017 in Blue Water Dokken, Esbjerg.

Semi-finals

Bronze medal match

Final

Final ranking and statistics

Top goalscorers
Counted from the round of 16 when DHF took over the tournament.

Most valuable player
MVP was announced after the final on 30 December 2018.

References

External links
 The Danish Handball Federation 

Handball competitions in Denmark